Tundra is a 2021 Cuban film directed by José Luis Aparicio. The film is about a lonely man dreaming of a mysterious woman who becomes his obsession. The film had its North American premiere at the 2022 Sundance Film Festival.

Tundra was partly crowdfunded through the Spanish platform Verkami and, according to the producers, it also received the support of the Cuban community in exile and some international cinephiles.

Synopsis

Cast
 Mario Guerra as Walfrido Larduet
 Neisy Alpízar as The Red Woman/Kirenia Natasha
 Laura Molina as Laurita García
 Jorge Molina as José José García
 Jorge Enrique Caballero as Amílcar, the philosophical inspector

References

External links
 

2021 films
2021 drama films
Cuban drama films
2020s Spanish-language films
Films shot in Cuba